Mt. Pleasant, also known as the Clemson Family Farm, is a historic home located at Union Bridge, Carroll County, Maryland, United States. It is a five-bay by two-bay, -story brick structure with a gable roof and built about 1815. Also on the property is a brick wash house, a hewn mortised-and-tenoned-and-pegged timber-braced frame wagon shed flanked by corn cribs, and various other sheds and outbuildings. It was the home farm of the Farquhar family, prominent Quakers of Scotch-Irish descent who were primarily responsible for the establishment of the Pipe Creek Settlement.

Mt. Pleasant was listed on the National Register of Historic Places in 1998.

References

External links
, including photo from 2006, at Maryland Historical Trust

Federal architecture in Maryland
Houses on the National Register of Historic Places in Maryland
Houses in Carroll County, Maryland
Houses completed in 1815
Quakerism in Maryland
Scotch-Irish American culture in Maryland
Union Bridge, Maryland
National Register of Historic Places in Carroll County, Maryland
1815 establishments in Maryland